Be Aware of Scorpions is the tenth full-length studio album recorded by the various M.S.G. lineups and the seventh album by the German hard rock band Michael Schenker Group released in 2001.

Track listing
All tracks by Schenker & Logan, except where noted

 "No Turning Back" – 4:36 
 "My Time's Up" – 3:37 
 "Fallen the Love" (Schenker, Logan, Patlan) – 4:28 
 "Because I Can" (Logan) – 3:01 
 "How Will You Get Back" – 4:54 
 "Blinded by Technology" – 5:08 
 "Age of Ice" – 3:55 
 "Standin' on the Road" – 5:18 
 "Sea of Memory" – 4:57 
 "On Your Way " – 3:39 
 "Reflection of Your Heart" – 4:51 
 "Roll It Over" – 3:19 
 "Eyes of a Child" – 4:51
 "Ride The Lightning" – 3:26 Bonus Track Japan

Personnel
 Chris Logan - vocals
 Michael Schenker - lead & rhythm guitars
 Reverend "Rev" Jones - bass guitar
 Jeff Martin - drums, percussion, vocals on "Roll It Over"
 Ralph Patlan - producer, engineer, percussion and bass guitar on "Age of Ice and "My Times Up"

Charts

References

2001 albums
Michael Schenker Group albums
SPV/Steamhammer albums